Erin Gomes Pinheiro (born 15 July 1997) is a Cape Verdean footballer who plays as a midfielder. Pinheiro holds a French passport.

Club career
Pinheiro is a youth exponent from Saint-Étienne. He made his Ligue 1 debut on 28 October 2015 against Paris Saint-Germain replacing Fabien Lemoine after 74 minutes in a 4–1 home win.

Pinheiro joined FK Haugesund on loan on the last day of the Norwegian transfer window, playing in their 2018 Norwegian Cup first round match against Skjold before the loan was terminated early on 10 May 2018.

References

Living people
1997 births
People from São Vicente, Cape Verde
Association football midfielders
Cape Verdean footballers
French footballers
French sportspeople of Cape Verdean descent
AS Saint-Étienne players
Ligue 1 players